
Gmina Brześć Kujawski is an urban-rural gmina (administrative district) in Włocławek County, Kuyavian-Pomeranian Voivodeship, in north-central Poland.

Villages
Apart from the town of Brześć Kujawski, Gmina Brześć Kujawski contains the villages and settlements of Aleksandrowo, Brzezie, Falborek, Falborz, Falborz-Kolonia, Gustorzyn, Guźlin, Jądrowice, Jaranówek, Kąkowa Wola, Kąkowa Wola-Parcele, Kąty, Kuczyna, Machnacz, Miechowice, Miechowice Duże, Parcele Sokołowskie, Pikutkowo, Redecz Krukowy, Rzadka Wola, Rzadka Wola-Parcele, Słone, Sokołowo-Kolonia, Starobrzeska Kolonia, Stary Brześć, Wieniec, Wieniec-Zalesie, Wieniec-Zdrój, Witoldowo and Wolica.

Neighbouring gminas
Gmina Brześć Kujawski is bordered by the city of Włocławek and by the gminas of Bądkowo, Lubanie, Lubraniec, Osięciny and Włocławek.

References
Polish official population figures 2006

Brzesc Kujawski
Włocławek County